Eduardo de la Puente (born December 7, 1963, in Buenos Aires) is an Argentine journalist and television presenter. He is perhaps most famous for his participation in the popular television show Caiga Quien Caiga broadcast on Telefé.

De la Puente has worked as a producer and presenter in radio and television since the early 1980s.
De la Puente was born in La Boca . He began her journalism career in program "El destape de Quilmes". He was a data musical redactor for the program "El puente". Then he was screenwriter and producer of "Música de cañerías" and "Los especiales de la Rock & Pop", artistic director of "FM Tropical" and conductor, producer and musical arranger of "Los especiales de Radio City", "La Rockola", "Con gusto a radio", "Boomerang" and "Parece mentira". Married with Ana Maria with which have an only son, Martin. Lives in Palermo, Buenos Aires, Argentine.

He makes up the program "¿Cuál es?" with Mario Pergolini and Marcelo Gantman.

References

External links
Profile at Facebook
 Eduardo de la Puente opinó sobre CQC 2009 at Extremista.com.ar

1963 births
Living people
People from Buenos Aires
Argentine television journalists
Argentine businesspeople